The Taymyr constituency (No.219) was a Russian legislative constituency in the Taymyr Autonomous Okrug in 1993–2007. In 2007 Taymyr AO alongside neighbouring Evenk AO were merged with Krasnoyarsk Krai, so currently the territory of former Taymyr and Evenk constituencies is now a part of Yeniseysk constituency of Krasnoyarsk Krai.

Members elected

Election results

1993

|-
! colspan=2 style="background-color:#E9E9E9;text-align:left;vertical-align:top;" |Candidate
! style="background-color:#E9E9E9;text-align:left;vertical-align:top;" |Party
! style="background-color:#E9E9E9;text-align:right;" |Votes
! style="background-color:#E9E9E9;text-align:right;" |%
|-
|style="background-color:"|
|align=left|Aleksandr Vasilyev
|align=left|Independent
|
|26.38%
|-
|style="background-color:"|
|align=left|Valentina Novikeyeva
|align=left|Independent
| -
|23.74%
|-
| colspan="5" style="background-color:#E9E9E9;"|
|- style="font-weight:bold"
| colspan="3" style="text-align:left;" | Total
| 
| 100%
|-
| colspan="5" style="background-color:#E9E9E9;"|
|- style="font-weight:bold"
| colspan="4" |Source:
|
|}

1995

|-
! colspan=2 style="background-color:#E9E9E9;text-align:left;vertical-align:top;" |Candidate
! style="background-color:#E9E9E9;text-align:left;vertical-align:top;" |Party
! style="background-color:#E9E9E9;text-align:right;" |Votes
! style="background-color:#E9E9E9;text-align:right;" |%
|-
|style="background-color:"|
|align=left|Nikolay Piskun
|align=left|Independent
|
|26.22%
|-
|style="background-color:"|
|align=left|Yelena Panina
|align=left|Zemsky Sobor
|
|25.47%
|-
|style="background-color:"|
|align=left|Viktor Nasedkin
|align=left|Our Home – Russia
|
|15.15%
|-
|style="background-color:"|
|align=left|Irina Levenets
|align=left|Liberal Democratic Party
|
|6.78%
|-
|style="background-color:"|
|align=left|Sergey Kirgizov
|align=left|Independent
|
|5.00%
|-
|style="background-color:"|
|align=left|Igor Priymak
|align=left|Independent
|
|4.31%
|-
|style="background-color:#1A1A1A"|
|align=left|Valery Marushchak
|align=left|Stanislav Govorukhin Bloc
|
|2.98%
|-
|style="background-color:#3A46CE"|
|align=left|Yelena Medvedkova
|align=left|Democratic Choice of Russia – United Democrats
|
|2.02%
|-
|style="background-color:#000000"|
|colspan=2 |against all
|
|10.37%
|-
| colspan="5" style="background-color:#E9E9E9;"|
|- style="font-weight:bold"
| colspan="3" style="text-align:left;" | Total
| 
| 100%
|-
| colspan="5" style="background-color:#E9E9E9;"|
|- style="font-weight:bold"
| colspan="4" |Source:
|
|}

1999

|-
! colspan=2 style="background-color:#E9E9E9;text-align:left;vertical-align:top;" |Candidate
! style="background-color:#E9E9E9;text-align:left;vertical-align:top;" |Party
! style="background-color:#E9E9E9;text-align:right;" |Votes
! style="background-color:#E9E9E9;text-align:right;" |%
|-
|style="background-color:"|
|align=left|Nikolay Piskun (incumbent)
|align=left|Our Home – Russia
|
|23.25%
|-
|style="background-color:"|
|align=left|Viktor Nasedkin
|align=left|Independent
|
|19.15%
|-
|style="background-color:"|
|align=left|Pyotr Kucherenko
|align=left|Independent
|
|11.53%
|-
|style="background-color:"|
|align=left|Adnan Muzykayev
|align=left|Independent
|
|6.83%
|-
|style="background-color:"|
|align=left|Gennady Subbotkin
|align=left|Liberal Democratic Party
|
|6.74%
|-
|style="background-color:#FCCA19"|
|align=left|Vladimir Grishin
|align=left|Congress of Russian Communities-Yury Boldyrev Movement
|
|6.29%
|-
|style="background-color:"|
|align=left|Anatoly Filatov
|align=left|Independent
|
|6.15%
|-
|style="background-color:#084284"|
|align=left|Vladimir Shtol
|align=left|Spiritual Heritage
|
|0.72%
|-
|style="background-color:#000000"|
|colspan=2 |against all
|
|17.06%
|-
| colspan="5" style="background-color:#E9E9E9;"|
|- style="font-weight:bold"
| colspan="3" style="text-align:left;" | Total
| 
| 100%
|-
| colspan="5" style="background-color:#E9E9E9;"|
|- style="font-weight:bold"
| colspan="4" |Source:
|
|}

2003

|-
! colspan=2 style="background-color:#E9E9E9;text-align:left;vertical-align:top;" |Candidate
! style="background-color:#E9E9E9;text-align:left;vertical-align:top;" |Party
! style="background-color:#E9E9E9;text-align:right;" |Votes
! style="background-color:#E9E9E9;text-align:right;" |%
|-
|style="background-color:"|
|align=left|Viktor Sitnov
|align=left|United Russia
|
|59.60%
|-
|style="background-color:"|
|align=left|Vadim Vaulin
|align=left|Independent
|
|7.11%
|-
|style="background-color:"|
|align=left|Oleg Pantela
|align=left|Independent
|
|5.28%
|-
|style="background-color:#164C8C"|
|align=left|Nikolay Lovelius
|align=left|United Russian Party Rus'
|
|2.64%
|-
|style="background-color:"|
|align=left|Sergey Simutin
|align=left|Independent
|
|2.43%
|-
|style="background-color:"|
|align=left|Sergey Lykov
|align=left|Liberal Democratic Party
|
|1.68%
|-
|style="background-color:#000000"|
|colspan=2 |against all
|
|19.86%
|-
| colspan="5" style="background-color:#E9E9E9;"|
|- style="font-weight:bold"
| colspan="3" style="text-align:left;" | Total
| 
| 100%
|-
| colspan="5" style="background-color:#E9E9E9;"|
|- style="font-weight:bold"
| colspan="4" |Source:
|
|}

References

Obsolete Russian legislative constituencies
Politics of the Taymyr Autonomous Okrug